Robert Wesley Steele (March 29, 1894 – January 27, 1962) was a Major League Baseball pitcher who played in four seasons. He played for the St. Louis Cardinals in 1916–1917, the Pittsburgh Pirates in 1917–1918 and the New York Giants in 1918–1919.

He is buried in Burlington, Wisconsin.

External links

1894 births
1962 deaths
Canadian expatriate baseball players in the United States
Baseball people from Ontario
Burials in Wisconsin
Indianapolis Indians players
Major League Baseball pitchers
Major League Baseball players from Canada
New York Giants (NL) players
Pittsburgh Pirates players
St. Louis Cardinals players